Rachhpal Singh (2 October 1942– 8 July 2021) was an Indian politician who served as Minister for Planning in the Government of West Bengal. He was also a MLA, elected from the Tarakeswar constituency in the 2011 West Bengal state assembly election.

Singh died from COVID-19 in 2021.

References 

State cabinet ministers of West Bengal
Trinamool Congress politicians from West Bengal
1943 births
2021 deaths
West Bengal MLAs 2016–2021
People from Hooghly district
Deaths from the COVID-19 pandemic in India